Flannery is a convention in the game of contract bridge.

Flannery may also refer to:

People

Surname
 Austin Flannery (1925–2008), a Dominican priest, editor, publisher and social justice campaigner
 Brian Flannery (born 1974), Irish hurler
 Brian P. Flannery, physicist who variously worked as an astrophysicist and as a climate modeller for ExxonMobil
 Bridget Flannery (born 1959), Irish painter
 Bryan Flannery (born 1967), American politician
 Chris Flannery (rugby league) (born 1980), Australian rugby player
 Christopher Dale Flannery (1948–1985), Australian hitman
 Constance O'Day-Flannery, American author
 D. Flannery, rugby league footballer
 Dan Flannery (born 1944), American actor
 Daniel Flannery (born 1952), American artist, producer, director, and designer
 Denis Flannery (1928–2012), Australian rugby player
 Edward Flannery (1912–1998), American priest and author
 Fearghal Flannery (born 1991), Irish hurler
 Frank Flannery, political consultant and Fine Gael's former Director of Organisations and Strategy
 Harry Flannery (1900–1975), America journalist and author
 J. Harold Flannery (1898–1961), American politician
 Jack Flannery (1952–2010), American off-road racing driver
 James Flannery (Ohio politician) (1938–2005), American politician
 James Fortescue Flannery (1851–1943), British engineer and politician
 Jerry Flannery (born 1978), Irish rugby player
 John Flannery (American football) (born 1969), American football player
 John L. Flannery (born 1962), American business executive
 Jude Flannery (died 1997), American triathlete
 Kate Flannery (born 1964), American actress
 Kent V. Flannery (born 1934), American archaeologist
 Lot Flannery (1836–1922), American sculptor
 Mark Flannery, American economist
 Martin Flannery (1918–2006), British politician
 Michael Flannery (1902–1994), Irish republican who fought in the Irish War of Independence and the Irish Civil War
 Mick Flannery (born 1983), Irish singer-songwriter
 Nathan Flannery (born 1992), New Zealand rower
 Niall Flannery (born 1991), English hurdler
 Nickoletta Flannery (born 1999), Australian footballer
 Paddy Flannery (born 1976), British football player
 Pat Flannery (born 1957), American basketball coach
 Paula Flannery (born 1974), New Zealand cricketer
 Peter Flannery (born 1951), British playwright
 Sarah Flannery (born 1982), Irish computer scientist
 Susan Flannery (born 1939), American actress
 Thomas Aquinas Flannery (1918–2007), American judge
 Tim Flannery (baseball) (born 1957), American baseball player
 Tim Flannery (born 1956), Australian scientist and activist
 Tom Flannery (born 1966), American singer-songwriter
 Tony Flannery (born 1948), Irish writer
 William Flannery (1898–1959), American art director
 William Flannery (bridge), American bridge player

Given name
 Flannery O'Connor (1925–1964), American writer

Other uses
 Cape Flannery, at the west end of Thule Island in the South Sandwich Islands
 Flannery baronets, a title in the Baronetage of the United Kingdom
 Flannery (Pokémon), a fictional character in the Pokémon universe

Surnames of Irish origin